Peletier may refer to:
Carol Peletier, a fictional character from the comic book series and television series The Walking Dead
Ed Peletier, husband of fictional Carol Peletier
Sophia Peletier, daughter of fictional Carol Peletier
Jacques Pelletier du Mans (1517–1582), also spelled Peletier, humanist, poet and mathematician of the French Renaissance

French-language surnames